Ao Vivo em Copacabana (English: Live in Copacabana) is the first live album by the Brazilian recording artist Claudia Leitte, released on June 27, 2008. The album was recorded during a single concert performed on February 17, 2008, at Copacabana beach in Rio de Janeiro in front of audiences of up to one million people. The disc had sold over 700,000 copies, which earned her a certified Triple Platinum and Gold Record by ABPD.

Track listing 
On June 27, 2008, the album was released in CD and digital download formats. A DVD with two discs set was released on August 11, 2008. On disc one comes a concert recorded on Copacabana beach, in addition to music videos and making of. On disc two comes a documentary showing the last few months of Claudia in the band Babado Novo and the beginning of his solo career. An extended play with songs that are only on DVD was released ony for digital download on September 5, 2008.

CD

DVD

Extended play 
Ao Vivo em Copacabana: Músicas Extraídas do DVD (English: Live in Copacabana: Songs from DVD) is the first extended play by Claudia Leitte, released on September 5, 2008. Contains four songs that are present on the DVD that are not on the CD track listing.

Charts

Weekly charts

Year-end charts

Certifications

Release history

References 

2008 live albums
Claudia Leitte albums
Live electropop albums
Live video albums
Universal Music Group live albums
Universal Music Group video albums
2008 video albums
Portuguese-language live albums
Portuguese-language video albums